The 2022 Chattanooga Mocs football team represented the University of Tennessee at Chattanooga as a member of the Southern Conference (SoCon) during the 2022 NCAA Division I FCS football season. The Mocs were led by third-year head coach Rusty Wright and played their home games at Finley Stadium in Chattanooga, Tennessee.

Previous season

The Mocs finished the 2021 season with a record of 6–5, 5–3 SoCon play to finish in third place.

Schedule

Game summaries

Wofford

at Eastern Illinois

North Alabama

at Illinois

at East Tennessee State

VMI

No. 11 Mercer

at No. 24 Furman

at The Citadel

No. 10 Samford

at Western Carolina

References

Chattanooga
Chattanooga Mocs football seasons
Chattanooga Mocs football